Glencoe is a village on the Northern Tablelands, New South Wales, Australia. It is part of the Glen Innes Severn Shire Council local government area.

The Main North railway line (now closed) had a platform and sidings, opened 1884, closed 1975.

The Red Lion Tavern is located there with a display of artworks and other memorabilia. Bellevue Cottage Gallery and Cafe has a range of crafts and cottage goods from the surrounding district. The historic Uniting Church there is over 100 years old. A sports ground is located on the northern side of the village, along with a fossicking area, to the south, on the creek. Here it may be possible to find sapphires or zircons. The Red Lion has re-opened since November 2011.

Glencoe was named by early European settlers after Glencoe, Scotland.
The main industry of the area is sheep and beef cattle breeding with some mining and a vineyard.

Media 
Glencoe is served by community radio station 2CBD FM. As well as broadcasting on two local FM frequencies 91.1 Deepwater and 105.9 Glen Innes, it has a live 24/7 feed via the internet. The station is the only radio station with studios in Glen Innes and is run by volunteers and presents local information and a diverse mix of music

References

Glen Innes: Celtic Country, Glen Innes Tourism, c.2008

External links

Northern Rivers Geology Blog - Glencoe

Towns in New South Wales
Towns in New England (New South Wales)
Main North railway line, New South Wales